Thelma White (born Thelma Wolpa; December 4, 1910 – January 11, 2005) was an American radio and film actress. White is best known for her role in the 1936 exploitation film Reefer Madness.

Early life and career
Born in Lincoln, Nebraska, White debuted in her family's circus show at age 2, acting as a "living doll" who stood in place until she got a cue to begin cooing and wriggling. At the age of 10, she was dancing in vaudeville as part of The White Sisters, leading to jobs with the Ziegfeld Follies and Earl Carroll revue, then moved to Hollywood in the late 1920s. Her first film was A Night in a Dormitory (1930) co-starring Ginger Rogers. This job led to a number of short films at Pathé Exchange (later RKO Pictures), where she played leading lady to familiar comics, such as Edgar Kennedy and Leon Errol.

White's most famous role arrived in Tell Your Children (1936), better known today as Reefer Madness, a low-budget exploitation film to warn audiences of the dangers of marijuana. White appeared as Mae, the oft-ignored voice of conscience to her dope-dealer boyfriend Jack (Carleton Young). Jack encourages high school students to take a toke of marijuana, after which they become involved in rape, prostitution, suicide, and various other traumas. The ephemeral film vanished into the vaults for over 30 years.

White continued to struggle through B-movies and small roles for the next few years, and in Hollywood circles, she was more known for her private life than her on-camera abilities. She was married three times, first to radio star Claude Stroud (one of the Stroud twins) for five years, then a brief marriage to Max Hoffman Jr. Her final marriage, to actor and costume designer Tony Millard, lasted for several decades.

Tell Your Children was found in a vault in 1972 and rechristened Reefer Madness by pro-marijuana activists and a young movie distributor that saw the movie as having great comedic appeal. The film gained a following on college campuses for its campy nature as well as its crazed depiction of marijuana use. White, who had starred with W. C. Fields and Jack Benny in her best years, somewhat was chagrined to be known for such a film. In 1987, she told the Los Angeles Times: "I'm ashamed to say that it's the only one of my films that's become a classic."

Entertaining troops
During World War II, White joined United Servicemen Overseas, a government program that featured entertainment for troops serving overseas, and performed as the leader of an all female swing band named Thelma White and Her All Girl Orchestra. She and her band went to Alaska on several occasions with Rose Hobart and Carmen Miranda. She continued to make appearances in B-movies such as the film series with The Bowery Boys, and near the end of the war, she contracted a crippling disease while in the Aleutian Islands. White was bedridden for five years and was told she never would walk again. Although she partially recovered and appeared in a few late 1940s films, her acting career was essentially over.

Together with her band, she released her most famous hit, "Shoo Shoo Ya Mama", in January 1946.

White later worked as an agent, representing actors such as Robert Blake and James Coburn.

Death
White's third husband, Tony Millard, died in 1999. She had no children and died of pneumonia in the Motion Picture and Television Hospital on January 11, 2005, at age 94. She was the last surviving cast member of Reefer Madness.

Filmography

References

External links

Actresses from Nebraska
American film actresses
American radio actresses
Deaths from pneumonia in California
Actors from Lincoln, Nebraska
Vaudeville performers
1910 births
2005 deaths
20th-century American actresses
21st-century American women